Recep İvedik 6 Is a Turkish comedy film, directed by Togan Gökbakar and co-written with Şahan Gökbakar, starring Şahan Gökbakar and Nurullah Çelebi. It is the sixth film in the Recep İvedik film series.

Storyline 
Surprisingly Recep founds himself in Kenya instead of Konya (an Anatolian city of Turkey) and the adventure begins.

Cast 
 Şahan Gökbakar - Recep İvedik
 Nurullah Çelebi - Nurullah Sağlam
 Somer Karvan - Tur guide Ersin
 Muhammed Ali Dönmez - Nurullah'ın nephew
 Mbaye Dieng - Songa
 Chidi Benjamin John - Nahu Chef
 Lorraine Kadye - Zouya
 Kepsin Misodi Teke - Hunkutu Chef

Construction phase

Shooting phase 
Filming began on September 3, 2018. It has been announced that part of the shooting will take place in the longoz forest in the Karacabey district of Bursa.

Publishing 
The film's vision date was initially announced as February 8, 2019. However, the vision date of the film was delayed due to disagreements between the filmmakers and movie theaters. The movie, which premiered at Kanyon Shopping Center on November 6, 2019, was released on November 8, 2019.

Sequel

References

External links 
 

2019 films
2019 comedy films
Turkish comedy films
2010s Turkish-language films
Turkish sequel films
Films shot in Turkey
Films set in Kenya
Films directed by Togan Gökbakar